Daryl Easton (August 13, 1955 – February 24, 2017), known professionally as Daryl and born Daryl Martinez, was an American magician based in Las Vegas. In his marketing he used the self-proclaimed title of "The Magician's Magician". Daryl usually went by his forename only.

He specialized in card tricks, close-up and parlor magic.

Career 
Two of his most famous contributions to magic were the "Hot Shot Cut", a knuckle-busting sleight where the spectator's chosen card spins like a boomerang out of the deck, and the "Ultimate Ambition" trick which allows a card to be inserted fairly into the middle of a deck and yet appear back on top.

Daryl won the gold medal at FISM - the World Congress of Magic (the "Olympics" of Magic), in Lausanne, Switzerland in 1982, with a routine that included his now famous Ambitious Card Routine using the Ultimate Ambition. He won six Academy Awards from The Magic Castle in Hollywood, California. Twice, his peers voted him Close-Up Magician of the Year (1980 and 1981), twice Parlour Magician of the Year (1986 and 1987) and twice Lecturer of the Year (1988 and 1992). The list goes on and on with victories in every major competition he has entered. More recently he was voted one of the 100 most influential magicians of the 20th century by Magic Magazine.

His first contact with magic was in 1962, as a 7 year old. A Svengali Deck his friend's family gave him was the start of everything. He was fascinated by magic as he thought of the kinds of tricks he could perform with this trick deck.

At first, he only showed his friends and family his tricks, but he later began performing street magic in San Diego. For several years, he would perform in the street during the day and perform close-up magic in night clubs at night, wearing a tuxedo.

In 1973, when he was 18, his performance at an exhibition held by the Kaiser Aluminum company was well received, and he began to travel with the company to perform at their exhibitions.

In 1999 and 2000 Daryl and his magician wife, Alison, toured the world with Daryl's "New Millennium World Tour Lecture". They lectured and performed in over 250 cities in 25 different countries.

In January 2001, Daryl performed magic at the inauguration celebration of President George W. Bush.

Daryl enjoyed performing and lecturing in Japan many times, including in February 1982, March 1983, 1985, September 1990 and 2000, and November 2005.

Daryl performed as a headline act at Caesars Magical Empire, Caesars Palace, Las Vegas for 7 years before deciding in 2003 to move, along with his young family, to the Sierra Foothills of northern California. There he continued to write, invent and perform magic for both lay people and the magical community.

Career as a lecturer 
He was well known to magicians as the presenter of many teach-in video series for L&L Publishing, including Daryl's Card Revelations, Encyclopedia of Card Sleights, FoolerDoolers, and Daryl's Ambitious Card Video.

In addition to lecturing around the world, he also taught individual and group lessons at his home. His wife, Alison Easton, was amongst the first women to be inducted into The Magic Circle.

Death 
On February 24, 2017, Daryl was found dead in his dressing room at Hollywood's Magic Castle, before a scheduled performance.

Initially, media reports varied widely, from suicide to accidental hanging. The final coroner report of the Los Angeles County, Department of Medical Examiner has ruled the death as suicide by hanging.

Awards 
1978 IBM San Diego Tournament Winner
1980 Academy of Magical Arts Magician of the Year Award
1981 Academy of Magical Arts Magician of the Year Award
1982 FISM Lausanne, Switzerland: Close-up Category, Gold Medal (first place)
1985 Las Vegas: Desert Magic Seminar Winner
1986 Academy of Magical Arts Parlor Magician of the Year Award
1987 Academy of Magical Arts Parlor Magician of the Year Award
1988 Academy of Magical Arts Lecturer of the Year Award
1992 Academy of Magical Arts Lecturer of the Year Award

Publications

References

External links
Daryl's official site
Interview with Daryl on the Magic Bunny website

1955 births
2017 suicides
Place of birth missing
American magicians
People from Auburn, California
Suicides by hanging in California
Academy of Magical Arts Close-Up Magician of the Year winners
Academy of Magical Arts Lecturer of the Year winners
Academy of Magical Arts Parlour Magician of the Year winners